"When We Make Love" is a song by American recording artist Ginuwine, taken from his fifth studio album Back II Da Basics (2005). It was written by Ernest Dixon and Cedric Solomon, while production was helmed by the latter. Released as the album's first single, it peaked at number 51 on the US Hot R&B/Hip-Hop Songs, becoming his lowest-charting leading single up to then.

Track listing

Credits and personnel
Credits lifted from the liner notes of Back II Da Basics.

Ivan Corraliza – recording engineer
Ernest Dixon – writer
Ginuwine – vocals
Jason Goldstein – mixing engineer
Dave Kutch – mastering engineer
Cerdric Solomon – writer

Charts

References

Ginuwine songs
2005 singles
Music videos directed by Philip Andelman
2005 songs
Songs written by Ginuwine